The 2013 KPL Top 8 Cup was the third edition of the tournament, which was originally scheduled to run from 3 April to 2 June 2013, but had the date of its final changed to 24 July. It was contested by the top 8 teams of the 2012 Kenyan Premier League season: A.F.C. Leopards, Chemelil Sugar, Gor Mahia, Mathare United, Sofapaka, Thika United, Tusker and Ulinzi Stars.

Gor Mahia were the defending champions, having won their first title the previous season, but were eliminated by eventual champions Tusker in the semi-finals, who beat Thika United to clinch their first title.

2012 Kenyan Premier League standings

Bracket

Quarter-finals
The draw for the quarter-finals was held on 27 March, and the ties were played on 3, 10, 17 and 24 April.

During the fixture between Chemelil Sugar and A.F.C. Leopards on 17 April, fans of the latter stormed onto the pitch claiming that their players were being unfairly treated by match officials during the 90th minute. Police were forced to intervene and take players and match officials off the pitch, and the match was abandoned with Chemelil Sugar winning 3–2. The KPL ruled Chemelil Sugar winners of the match and therefore qualified to the semi-finals.

Fixtures

Semi-finals
The semi-finals are being played over two legs on a home-and-away basis on 1, 8, 15 and 23 May.

First leg
The first leg ties of the semi-finals were played on 1 and 8 May.

Fixtures

Second leg
The second leg ties of the semi-finals were played on 15 and 23 May.

Fixtures

1–1 on aggregate. Thika United won through a penalty shoot-out.

Tusker won 1–0 on aggregate.

Final
The final will be played on 24 July.

Top scorers

Team statistics

|-
|colspan="20"|Eliminated in the semi-finals
|-

|-
|colspan="20"|Eliminated in the quarter-finals
|-

Notes

References

External links
 2013 KPL Top 8 Cup on Futaa.com

KPL Top 8 Cup seasons
Top 8 Cup